Snedeker may refer to:

Bradley Snedeker (born 1977), American television actor
Brandt Snedeker (born 1980), American golfer
Caroline Snedeker (1871–1956), American writer
Clifford W. Snedeker (1931–1996), American politician
Colin Snedeker (1936–2016), British-born American chemist 
Edward W. Snedeker (1903–1995), officer of the United States Marine Corps with the rank of lieutenant general
Jan Snedeker (c. 1609 – c. 1685), arrived in New Netherland, later New Amsterdam around 1639

See also
Snedeker Glacier, a channel glacier flowing to the Antarctic coast west of Merritt Island
Snedeker's Landing or Waldberg Landing, now known as Haverstraw Beach State Park